Friedrich von Hagedorn (23 April 1708 – 28 October 1754), German poet, was born at Hamburg, where his father, a man of scientific and literary taste, was Danish ambassador. His younger brother, Christian Ludwig, was a well known art historian and collector.

Biography

Life
He was educated at the gymnasium of Hamburg, and later (1726) became a student of law at Jena. Returning to Hamburg in 1729, he obtained the appointment of unpaid private secretary to the Danish ambassador in London, where he lived till 1731. Hagedorn's return to Hamburg was followed by a period of great poverty and hardship, but in 1733 he was appointed secretary to the so-called "English Court" (Englischer Hof) in Hamburg, a trading company founded in the 13th century. He shortly afterwards married, and from this time had sufficient leisure to pursue his literary occupations until his death.

Career
The first collection of Hagedorn's poems was published at Hamburg shortly after his return from Jena in 1729, under the title Versuch einiger Gedichte (reprinted by A. Sauer, Heilbronn, 1883). In 1738 appeared Versuch in poetischen Fabeln und Erzählungen; in 1742 a collection of his lyric poems, under the title Sammlung neuer Oden und Lieder; and his Moralische Gedichte in 1750. A collection of his entire works was published at Hamburg in 1757 after his death. The best is J.J. Eschenburg's edition (5 vols., Hamburg, 1800). Selections of his poetry with an excellent introduction in F. Muncker's Anakreontiker und preussisch-patriotische Lyriker (Stuttgart, 1894). See also H. Schuster, F. von Hagedorn und seine Bedeutung für die deutsche Literatur (Leipzig, 1882); W. Eigenbrodt, Hagedorn und die Erzählung in Reimversen (Berlin, 1884).

Mozart set his poem Die Alte (The Old Woman) in his song of the same name (K. 517) in 1787. Joseph Haydn set two of his poems in his canons (a capella songs) (Hob. XXVIIb).

References

External links
Poems of Friedrich von Hagedorn (Complete) 

1708 births
1754 deaths
18th-century German poets
Writers from Hamburg
University of Jena alumni
German male poets
German-language poets
18th-century German male writers